This article shows statistics of individual players for the football club F.C. Copenhagen. It also lists all matches that F.C. Copenhagen played in the 2013–14 season.

Players

Squad information
This section show the squad as currently, considering all players who are confirmedly moved in and out (see section Players in / out).

Squad stats

Players in / out

In

Out

Club

Coaching staff

Kit

|
|
|
|

Other information

Competitions

Overall

Danish Superliga

Classification

Results summary

Results by round

UEFA Champions League

Group B

Results summary

Matches

Competitive

References

External links
 F.C. Copenhagen official website

2013-14
Danish football clubs 2013–14 season
2013–14 UEFA Champions League participants seasons